The Six Days of Herning was a six-day track cycling race held annually in the Messecenter Herning, Denmark.

The first Six Days of Herning, contested in 1974, were won by Léo Duyndam and Ole Ritter. Fourteen editions took place: 10 from 1974 to 1983 and 4 from 1995 to 1998.

Gert Frank holds the record for victories there with 5 successes. After several podium finishes in the 70s and 80s, Australian Danny Clark still finished third in 1996 at the age of 45.

Winners

External links 

Cycle races in Denmark
Six-day races
Recurring sporting events established in 1974
Recurring sporting events disestablished in 1998
1974 establishments in Denmark
1998 disestablishments in Denmark
Defunct cycling races in Denmark

References